Swedish beauty pageants are competitions operating for Swedish females. Sweden had won two international pageants a total of three times as of 2010.

 Miss Sweden for Miss World used to be a handpicked delegate at the Miss Sweden pageant (in Swedish: Fröken Sverige). Sponsors were VeckoRevyn, female magazine that today operates in 21 countries worldwide. The title was dropped after a feminist wave throughout the Swedish nation and inside the magazine network itself during the 1990s. Broadcast at that time were TV4, between 1992 and 2000.
 Miss Sweden for Miss Universe used to be an official delegate at the Miss Sweden pageant (in Swedish: Fröken Sverige). The winner of this pageant had always higher expectations than the delegate competing at Miss World. Directors were from the female magazine VeckoRevyn. Last competition was arranged by the Moore! Magazine and received a lot of attention as the pageant was more free-minded than the previous one.
 Miss World Sweden was created in 2002 in response to Sweden's lack of interest in the Miss World pageant. Current sponsor is the female magazine Hänt Extra and broadcast by TV7.
 Miss Universe Sweden is currently a new pageant under sponsorship by Starworld Entertainment. It is broadcast by Star! Scandinavia. Rival contest is Nya Fröken Sverige (New Miss Sweden) arranged by Panos Emporio.

Miss Sweden for Miss World (1951-2003; 2020-present) 

 (VeckoRevyn 1951–2000) (TV3 2001–2003) (Miss Sweden Organization 2020-present)

Miss Sweden for Miss Universe (1952-2004) 
 (VeckoRevyn 1952–2000) (TV3 2001–2003) (Moore! 2004)

New Miss Sweden (Nya Fröken Sverige) for Miss Universe (2006-2009) 
 (Panos Emporio 2006-2009)

Miss Sweden for Miss Europe 
 (VeckoRevyn 1949–1984) (Swedish Models 1985–Present)

Miss Sweden for Miss International (1960-2008; 2021-present)
 (Årent Runt 1960–1994) (Fashion For Integration 2000–2008) (Miss Sweden Organization 2021-present)

Miss Sweden for Miss Scandinavia 
Monica Rågby
Birgitta Alverljung
Gun Sundberg 
Eva-Lisa Svensson
Gunilla Friden 
Ing-Marie Ahlin
Christina Bolinder
Eva Andersson
Eva-Lena Lundgren 
Bolette Christopherson 
Annelie Eriksson 
Britt-Inger Johansson
Wivianne "Vivi" Öiangen

Miss Sweden for Miss Earth (2020-present)
 (Miss Sweden Organization 2020-present)

Miss Earth Sweden (2003-2019)
 (Carousel Productions 2003-2013) (Starworld Sweden 2011–2019)

Miss International Sweden (2011-2020)  
 (Starworld Entertainment 2011-2020)

Miss World Sweden (2003-2019)
 (Hänt Extra 2003-2019)

Miss Universe Sweden (2009-present)
 (Starworld Entertainment 2009-present)

External links 
 VeckoRevyn
 Hänt Extra
 Starworld Entertainment
 Miss International Sweden
 Miss World Sweden
 Miss Universe Sweden official homepage
 Miss Earth Sweden official homepage

Miss Sweden titleholders
Miss Sweden titleholders
Miss Sweden titleholders